Argus Mountain is a mountain on Vancouver Island, British Columbia, Canada, located  southwest of Courtenay and  north of The Red Pillar.

Argus Mountain is a member of the Vancouver Island Ranges which in turn form part of the Insular Mountains.

History
Argus Mountain was named...
...to recognize the newspaper, Comox Argus, whose editor, Mr. Ben Hughes, attempted to climb this mountain in 1931. Argus in turn means "watchful guardian"

Access

Given its stellar position surrounded by other island peaks, no direct routes exist to Argus Mountain.  This mountain can be reached from other summits by crossing high alpine ridges and glaciers.  It is frequently reached from the Comox Glacier and The Red Pillar.

See also
List of mountains in Strathcona Provincial Park

References

Vancouver Island Ranges
Mid Vancouver Island
One-thousanders of British Columbia
Clayoquot Land District